Padmavyooham may refer to:

Padmavyooham (1973 film), Malayalam film released in 1973 starring Prem Nazir and Vijayasree
Padmavyooham (2012 film), Malayalam film released in 2012 starring Noby Tharian and Anchal Babu